The Honda CBF500 is a standard motorcycle made by Honda between 2004 and 2007. It is the Euro-2 compliant replacement of the Honda CB500. It was discontinued after 2007 as new Euro-3 standards become mandatory in EU, the natural replacement is the bigger inline-four 600 cc powered Honda CBF600.

The CBF500 uses the same engine, transmission and final drive as the earlier CB models, but engine is a stressed member of the frame. It has updated fuel and emissions systems, and new instruments, bodywork and suspension.  Unlike the CB, the CBF was only available as a naked bike without the half-fairing of the previous CB500S version.

ABS and non-ABS versions were produced, the ABS versions carrying the designation CBF500A. Model designations were:
CBF500 4 - Non-ABS, 2004 to 2005.
CBF500A 4 - ABS, 2004 to 2005.
CBF500 6 - Non-ABS, 2006 to 2007.
CBF500A 6 - ABS, 2006 to 2008.

CB500F 2013-
For model year 2013, Honda introduced a new global family of CB500 motorcycles. This family includes a naked model called the CB500F. It has a displacement of 471 cc, and is an entirely new design.

References

CBF500
Motorcycles introduced in 2004
Motorcycles powered by straight-twin engines